Tab Energy was a low calorie energy drink created by The Coca-Cola Company. The beverage is unique as it is sweetened with sucralose (rather than saccharin), it has a translucent pink color, and is lightly carbonated.

It is packed in  slim cans (with a shape similar to the can used for Red Bull). (It also contains 785 mg taurine, 116 mg ginseng extract, 19 mg carnitine, and 0.90 mg guarana extract, according to the can.)

The drink is currently being targeted and advertised towards a female market as illustrated by the pink color theme and slogan 'Fuel to be Fabulous'. The song used in the American version of the commercial is "Cobrastyle" by the Teddybears.

Tab Energy is also available in Mexico since December 2006, in New Zealand since February 26, 2007, and in Spain since September 2008 under the name Tab Fabulous. This drink is currently being taken off the market by Coca-Cola.

Ingredients
Ingredients are carbonated water, citric acid, taurine, natural and artificial flavors, sodium citrate, sodium benzoate, ginseng extract, caffeine, vegetable juice, acesulfame potassium, sucralose, carnitine fumarate, niacinamide (Vitamin B3), pyridoxine hydrochloride (Vitamin B6), Guarana extract, and cyanocobalamin (Vitamin B12).

Ad campaign
The Tab energy drink campaign was driven by Hollywood Lifestyle. The product launch was on Feb. 2, 2006 with a premiere party during New York Fashion Week ‘06. Their ad campaign slogan is “Tab Energy... Fuel To Be Fabulous”. The original broadcast of the Tab Energy commercial aired during the Oscar telecast in 2006. The commercial features well dressed, attractive women, who could very well be Hollywood stars, and their daily activities, including shopping for extravagant clothing, driving expensive cars, dining at exclusive restaurants, and dating exceedingly handsome gentlemen.

The official website for the drink has various features, including links to photos of Tab launch parties at exclusive venues.

In addition, FoxNews.com published an article called “Pink Power: Tab Is Back, Sort Of” that mentions how Tab is the new favorite energy drink of Hollywood stars. There are even people quoted within the article that mention how “Nicole Richie and Fergie (from The Black Eyed Peas) were seen guzzling Tab Energy drink all over Manhattan… and when these two put their stamp of approval on a product, expect other celebrities to follow suit” and that “"[t]he design is great and it is a much prettier can to be caught by the paparazzi drinking — and the pink design makes it almost like an accessory.”

References

External links 
 

Coca-Cola brands
Energy drinks
Diet drinks
Products introduced in 2006